Esena Foundation High School, or Esena, was a private fee-paying academic institution for girls only. It was located in Gulberg, Lahore, Punjab, Pakistan. Established in 1964, Esena was the very first private education institute for girls in Pakistan. Esena's director Begum Majid was a very learned lady. She was the daughter of the late Imam Jafer, the chief justice of India. The school closed in 2017.

References

Private schools in Pakistan
Girls' schools in Pakistan
High schools in Pakistan
Cambridge schools in Pakistan
Schools in Lahore
Educational institutions established in 1964
1964 establishments in Pakistan
Defunct schools in Pakistan